Endre is a populated area, a socken (not to be confused with parish), on the Swedish island of Gotland. It comprises the same area as the administrative Endre District, established on 1January 2016.

Geography 
Endre is situated in the central part of Gotland, just east of Visby. The medieval Endre Church is located in the socken. , Endre Church belongs to Endre parish in Romaklosters pastorat.

The Ölbäck (litt. "Beer stream") nature reserve is in Endre. The  reserve was designated a Natura 2000 area in 2004. In the north part of the reserve is a stone cross, erected to commemorate the place where a priest, Mr Jörgen, is said to have been killed by an eagle as he was riding home to Endre in 1336.

References

External links 

Objects from Endre at the Digital Museum by Nordic Museum

Populated places in Gotland County
Natura 2000 in Sweden